Garuda Gamana Vrishabha Vahana is an 2021 Indian Kannada-language gangster film written and directed by actor-director Raj B. Shetty. The film is produced by Ravi Rai Kalasa and Vachan Shetty, under Lighter Buddha Films. The film features Raj B. Shetty and Rishab Shetty in the lead roles. The music was scored by Midhun Mukundan. Both editing and cinematography were done by Praveen Shriyan. It was presented by Rakshit Shetty's Paramvah Studios.

Plot
Brahmaiah is a well behaved and mild mannered cop, who gets transferred to Mangaladevi, the coastal and cultural town of modern-day Mangalore, which is also infested with gang violence by the gangster duo, Shiva and Hari. While everyone knows that Hari was born and brought up in Mangaladevi, no one knows about Shiva’s origins. He was discovered in a bag, found in a well near Hari's home. When the villagers opened the bag, they found a 12-year old Shiva with his neck brutally cut and scars found all over his body. Shiva was later taken to the hospital, through which he survived. He spent some time begging in the streets of Mangalore until he was found and adopted by Hari's mother. Hari and Shiva grew up to be best friends and brothers for life. 

Everyone assumed that Shiva was severely abused during his unknown childhood. While he was hospitalised after being found, he used to scream as if he was dying whenever a nurse or female doctor approached him. He was completely desensitized to violence and has anger management issues. Though Shiva is mostly unreactive when he himself was harmed, if somebody threatened to harm his loved ones or people close to him, he used to erupt like a volcano and was capable of unspeakable things. Hari profited tremendously from Shiva's fury as Shiva's protection made Hari untouchable. Growing into their adulthood, Shiva remains unsophisticated and a man of few words, while Hari becomes a suave power player and the most feared gangster in town. He runs the gangs and the police are in his pocket.

Hari eventually joins hands with a senior gangster and businessman, Raviraj, just for the sake of his growth. As a result, Shiva is dejected as he was sidelined by Hari, who now reveres Raviraj. Unable to express himself, Shiva starts beating up people unnecessarily. Hari distances himself from Shiva, whose violent nature can be a double-edged sword. Eventually, a small problem emerges between Raviraj's brother-in-law and Hari, to which Shiva reacts violently. This leads to Hari further distancing himself from Shiva and Raviraj's gang plot to kill Shiva, as a result. Brahmaiah, who initially wanted to secure a transfer and run to safety from the violent town, finds newfound courage when he is threatened by Hari and Shiva indirectly, and humiliated by an MLA, who wants Hari and Shiva to be destroyed. 

Brahmaiah is aided by a police driver, who agrees to be a double agent for him as well as Hari-Shiva gangs. He plays Hari and Shiva's sides against each other to further destroy Hari and Shiva. When Brahmaiah learns of Raviraj's gang's plan to kill Shiva, he passes on the information to Shiva's friends, that Hari has sent people to kill Shiva. Shiva is saved by his friends in the nick of time, but the information that Hari sent people to kill him deeply troubles Shiva. Unbeknownst to Shiva, the same night, Shiva's friends leave to kill Hari in revenge and one of them is killed by Hari. Hari now thinks that Shiva sent people to kill Hari, and openly threatens that he will kill Shiva and have a victory lap around the town. Shiva though taken aback, threatens him back.

Shiva kills Raviraj's brother-in-law in retaliation for the loss of his gang member. This causes Hari to plot with Raviraj to kill Shiva. Eventually, Hari has a hired hitman shoot and kill Shiva while he is playing cricket with his friends. When Hari is out on his victory lap around the town after getting Shiva killed, the teenage boys who used to play cricket with Shiva had witnessed his shooting, where they follow Hari and kill him with his own knife. The epilogue shows the childhood forms of Hari and Shiva burying their respective adult forms.

Cast
 Raj B. Shetty as Shiva
 Harshadeep as young Shiva
 Rishab Shetty as Hari
 Chinthan as young Hari
 Gopal Krishna Deshpande as S.I. Brahmaiyya
 V.J. Vineeth
 Jyothish Shetty as Raviraj
 Deepak Rai Paanaaje as Shekhara
 Shanil Guru as Karunakar
 Prakash Thuminad as Ramanath
 J.P. Tuminad as Avinash
 Anil Uppala as Pili Prakasha
 Arpith Adyar as Avinash's friend
 Yathish Baikampady as Yemmekere Dayananda
 Sachin Anchan
 Saumesh
 R.J. Arpith Indravadan

Symbolism in GGVV 

Garuda Gamana refers to Vishnu (or Hari) who is known to ride Garuda, as his vehicle. Vrishaba Vahana refers to Shiva, who is known to ride Nandi, as his vehicle. Thus the title refers to both Vishnu and Shiva, along with their vehicles.

Soundtrack
Midhun Mukundan composed the background score for the film and the soundtracks. The lyrics for the soundtracks Chandrachooda and Sojugada Soojumallige were adopted from Purandara Dasa's work and a popular folk song, respectively - retaining the original titles. The album consists of 4 soundtracks.

Legacy
Garuda Gamana Vrishabha Vahana has made into the FC Gold list of films of Film Companion, where it made a great impact on Raj B. Shetty's career as everyone praised his acting skills. The film was released on the ZEE5 and achieved more than 8 crore minutes of viewing within 3 days of its release on the OTT. It remained in the national top 10 movies for more than two weeks since its release on ZEE5.

The film also received praise from other prominent celebrities like Anurag Kashyap, Rana Daggubati, Ajay Rao, Nidhi Subbaiah, Ramya, Ram Gopal Varma, Sudeepa, Prashanth Neel, and Shivarajkumar for the direction, story and technical aspects. Actor and director Gautham Vasudev Menon bought the remake rights and planned to remake it in Tamil and Telugu and it was dubbed in Malayalam with the same name.

Awards and nominations

References

External links 

 

2021 films
2020s Kannada-language films